The 1993 Mazda Classic was a women's tennis tournament played on outdoor hard courts at the La Costa Resort and Spa in San Diego, California in the United States that was part of Tier II of the 1993 WTA Tour. It was the 15th edition of the tournament and was held from August 2 through August 8, 1993. First-seeded Steffi Graf won the singles title and earned $75,000 first-prize money as well as 300 ranking points

Finals

Singles
 Steffi Graf defeated  Arantxa Sánchez Vicario, 6–4, 4–6, 6–1
 It was Graf's 6th singles title of the year and the 75th of her career.

Doubles
 Gigi Fernández /  Helena Suková defeated  Pam Shriver /  Elizabeth Smylie, 6–4, 6–3

References

External links
 ITF tournament edition details
 Tournament draws

Mazda Classic
Southern California Open
Toshiba Classic
1993 in American tennis